Cavicella is a genus of bacteria which belongs to the class Gammaproteobacteria with one known species (Cavicella subterranea). Cavicella subterranea has been isolated from mineral water from a 150-metre-deep borehole in Portugal.

Cavicella’s temperature range is mesophilic, growing best at moderate temperatures, between 25°C and 40°C. Cavicella specifically, grows best at 28°C.

References

Monotypic bacteria genera
Moraxellaceae
Bacteria genera